"Love to Hate You" is a song by English synth-pop duo Erasure, released in September 1991 as the second single from their fifth studio album, Chorus (1991). Written by band members Vince Clarke and Andy Bell, it is an electronic dance track inspired by disco music. The synthesizer melody in the chorus is an interpolation of the string break from American singer Gloria Gaynor's disco-era classic "I Will Survive". The duo also recorded a Spanish version of the song, called "Amor y Odio" (Love and Hatred), and one in Italian called "Amo Odiarti". The single was released by Mute Records in the UK and Sire Records in the US. It peaked at number four on the UK Singles Chart and became a top-10 hit in Austria, Denmark, Finland, Greece, Ireland, and Sweden.

Chart performance
"Love to Hate You" is one of Erasure's most successful singles on the UK Singles Chart, peaking at number four. It became a top-ten hit also in Greece, where it reached number nine; Finland, where it reached number seven; Austria, where it reached number six; Denmark and Ireland, where it reached number five; and Sweden, where it reached number four. In the US it reached number 17 on the Billboard Hot Dance Music/Club Play chart, number 10 on the Billboard Hot Dance Music/Maxi-Singles Sales chart, and number six on the Billboard Modern Rock Tracks chart.

Critical reception
Larry Flick from Billboard named "Love to Hate You" a "techno-conscious twirler", that nicks an idea or two from Gloria Gaynor's "I Will Survive". He complimented Andy Bell's "sassy and soulful" performance as an interesting contrast to the track's "overall electro tone". Andy Kastanas from The Charlotte Observer declared it as "a much more pop-oriented song, lacking the trademark Erasure synth riff". Bill Wyman from Entertainment Weekly felt that it "has a thumpy bottom and a passable hook". Dave Jennings of Melody Maker considered the song to be "likeable, upbeat, a little bloodless but nevertheless a guaranteed top five entry". He also noted the "mildly interesting lyric". Pan-European magazine Music & Media stated that it's a "top rate pop/dance song, which draws influences from '70s Giorgio Moroder productions. The synthesizer outfit takes us to a lovely Caribbean bridge that will work as well on EHR as in clubland." 

A reviewer from Music Week constated that the "instant familiarity" of "Love to Hate You" "is due in no small part to the fact that it seems to be based on several previous hits, most notably Gloria Gaynor's 'I Will Survive', Elton John's 'Nobody Wins' and even Modern Romance's 'Everybody Salsa'. Typically throbbing Hi-NRG, subtle it is not, but a hit it most certainly is." Sherman at the Big Controls, writing for NME, felt it was "totally over the top pop" with a "sickly verse, death defying numbing Brits abroad chorus, wanky 'fake' horns and the worst keyboard sounds Vince could find". Mark Frith from Smash Hits wrote that "it's rather nice to welcome Erasure back. With a tune that's, erm, borrowing bits from certain '70s dance tunes, it's a tale of life's annoying Casanovas, and full of beans it is too."

Retrospective response
AllMusic editor Ned Raggett described the song as "supersassy". In an 2007 review, the Daily Vault's Michael R. Smith viewed it as "an instant crowd pleaser of sorts", adding that it "comes complete with live audience effects in the background". In 2014, Chris Gerard from Metro Weekly described it as "old-school disco with echoes of 'I Will Survive' in the verse and hints of ABBA as well. It's a killer dance tune, but it's just as good as a pop single. The vocal arrangement is clever, and the crowd noise during the big synth solos add to the excitement." In 2009, Darren Lee from The Quietus noted "the camp melodrama", stating that it is one of "the most gloriously effervescent pop anthems ever recorded". In an 2020 review, Christopher Smith from Talk About Pop Music described it as "more early-80's style electro pop and yet it felt so fresh in 1991". He added: "This is one of those Erasure songs that you know word for word and are able to quote without fail at any concert where this is played."

Music video
A music video was produced to promote the single. It features Erasure performing the song on a futuristic stage with a long, connected runway which extends out into the audience. As Bell dances down the runway, it is revealed that the floor is covered in water. Vince Clarke is also seen playing a circular keyboard similar to one previously used by Jean-Michel Jarre. These shots were filmed in London's Leadenhall Market.

Track listings

 7-inch and cassette single (MUTE131; CMUTE131)
 "Love to Hate You"
 "Vitamin C"

 12-inch single (12MUTE131)
 "Love to Hate You" (12-inch mix)
 "Vitamin C" (12-inch mix) [Paul Dakeyne Mix]
 "La La La"

 CD single (CDMUTE131)
 "Love to Hate You"
 "Love to Hate You" (12-inch mix) [Paul Dakeyne Mix]
 "Vitamin C"
 "La La La"

 US CD single (40218-2)
 "Love to Hate You" (album version)
 "Love to Hate You" (Bruce Forest Mix)
 "Vitamin C" (12-inch mix) [Paul Dakeyne Mix]
 "Love to Hate You" (12-inch mix) [Paul Dakeyne Mix]
 "Vitamin C"
 "La La La"

 Italian Promo Only 12-inch single (Love 100)
 "Love to Hate You" (J.T. Company Remix)
 "Love to Hate You" (J.T. Company Instrumental Remix)
 "Love to Hate You" (Joe T. Vannelli Remix Dub)
 "Love to Hate You" (Joe T. Vannelli Single Remix)

Charts

Weekly charts

Year-end charts

References

1991 singles
1991 songs
Erasure songs
Sire Records singles
Songs written by Andy Bell (singer)
Songs written by Vince Clarke
Music videos directed by David Mallet (director)
Mute Records singles